The realme 3 series is a smartphone from the Indian-based Chinese company realme, in March 2019. The realme 3 pro was released later that year in May. After the release of Realme 3, finally Realme 3i was released in the middle of that year in July.

Specifications

Hardware 
Realme 3 utilises Gradient Unibody Design, with matched color. It is equipped with MediaTek Helio P60 (International Edition) or P70 (India Edition) processors. It is equipped with a 4230mAh battery. The realme 3 has an improved hardware configuration over the previous models, and its rear dual camera has been upgraded to a combination 13MP main camera + 2MP secondary camera, with the primary camera's single-pixel size being 1.12 um, with a f/1.8 aperture and 5P lenses.

Realme 3 features a 6.2-inch (158 mm) 1520x720 pixel HD+ screen, with an aspect ratio of 19:9. The display is covered by a single pane of Corning Glass. It is equipped with a Li-Po 4,230 mAh battery. Realme 3 has included a loudspeaker, and the phone retains the 3.5mm audio jack.

Software 
Realme 3 comes equipped with the ColorOS 6.0 and borderless design. It has improved more than 20 system functions over the realme 2, based on user suggestions and feedback from social media and the realme community.

Realme 3 is also the first model in its segment with hand-held night mode, using AI technology, multi-frame synthesis, and anti-shake algorithms, the camera's imaging level in dark lighting conditions is improved from the previous model realme 2. Its Chroma Boost mode uses AI technology to identify objects and optimize photos and improve images’ overall dynamic range with richer details in highlights and shadows and more balanced exposure.

References

Realme mobile phones
Smartphones
Mobile phones introduced in 2019
Android (operating system) devices
Chinese brands
Mobile phones with multiple rear cameras
Discontinued smartphones